J. Kwabena Asamoah-Gyadu or Johnson Kwabena Asamoah-Gyadu  is a Ghanaian scholar of African Pentecostalism.

Biography 
Asamoah-Gyadu received a Certificate in Pastoral Ministry (1986) from Trinity Theological Seminary, Legon, a BA in Religion and Sociology (1987) and a MPhil in Religion (1994) from the University of Ghana, and a PhD in Theology (2000) from the University of Birmingham. He is an ordained minister of the Methodist Church Ghana and, in 2015, was elected as a Fellow of the Ghana Academy of Arts and Sciences. He has held teaching posts at Trinity Theological Seminary, Legon since 1994, and is currently Baëta-Grau Professor of African Christianity and Pentecostal/Charismatic Theology and, since 2018, President of the seminary.

Asamoah-Gyadu is known for his writings related to African Pentecostal and charismatic Christianity. He has also written a few articles related to digital media and digital religion.

A festschrift has been prepared in his honor, entitled African Pentecostalism and World Christianity (2020).

Works

References

Further reading 
 

World Christianity scholars
Ghanaian theologians
Ghanaian Methodists
Living people
Year of birth missing (living people)
Fellows of the Ghana Academy of Arts and Sciences